Streetheart is a 1998 film that was awarded the Crystal Globe at the Karlovy Vary International Film Festival in 1998. It was directed by French Canadian director Charles Binamé.

Cast

Awards
1998 Pascale Montpetit won Best Actress at the Jutra Awards
1998 Pascale Montpetit won Best Actress at the Mons International Festival of Love Films
1998 Anne-Marie Cadieux won Best Supporting Actress at the Jutra Awards
1998 Charles Binamé won Best Director at the 33rd Karlovy Vary International Film Festival
1998 The film won the Crystal Globe at the 33rd Karlovy Vary International Film Festival
1998 Charles Binamé and Monique Proulx won Best Canadian Screenplay at the Vancouver International Film Festival

References

External links
 IMDB listing
 

1998 films
1998 comedy-drama films
Crystal Globe winners
Films directed by Charles Binamé
Canadian comedy-drama films
French-language Canadian films
1990s Canadian films